The Crow Wing State Forest is a state forest located near Fairfield Township in Crow Wing County, Minnesota. The managed acres are split nearly equally between the Minnesota Department of Natural Resources, Crow Wing County, and the privately owned Potlatch Corp.

Prior to European settlement the area was mainly oak forests and barrens interspersed with pine stands and prairie. Today, Eastern white pine and Norway pine dominate, although stands of oak, aspen, and jack pine occur upland, with wet prairies and conifer bogs in the lowlands.

The interactive Bass Lake Nature Trail (either ) introduces users to the forest dynamics present in the forest, including wildfire, snags and its effects on wildlife, and the oak canker, Diplodia quercina. Picnicking, fishing, and hunting are also commonly practiced outdoor recreation activities. Waterways within the forest also allow canoers, kayakers, and boaters access to the Pine and Mississippi Rivers.

See also
List of Minnesota state forests

References

External links
Crow Wing State Forest - Minnesota Department of Natural Resources (DNR)

Minnesota state forests
Protected areas of Crow Wing County, Minnesota
Protected areas established in 1935